Puzzle Bots is a graphic adventure developed by Ivy Games and published by Wadjet Eye Games. The game uses a point and click interface to interact with the environment to solve puzzles and communicate with characters.

Reception

The game received above-average reviews according to the review agregation website Metacritic. Gamezebo called it "An incredibly charming adventure, packed with plenty of humor and some deviously clever puzzles." Adventure Gamers also praised the game's "great mix of bot abilities and [...] charming story".

See also
Gravity Ghost

References

External links
 

2010 video games
Adventure Game Studio games
Adventure games
Indie video games
Point-and-click adventure games
Single-player video games
Video games about robots
Video games developed in the United States
Wadjet Eye Games games
Windows games
Windows-only games